The M30 motorway is a Hungarian motorway that connects the M3 motorway to the Slovak R4 expressway near the border town of Tornyosnémeti via Miskolc, forming part of European routes E71 and E79. The first section opened to the public in 2002, and reached the border area in October 2021.

Road is considered as part of planned Via Carpathia from the Baltic coast to Sofia. It follows the route of main road 3.

Openings timeline
Mezőcsát; M3 – Emőd (6 km): 2002
Emőd – Nyékládháza (8 km): 2003
Nyékládháza – Miskolc-east (15 km): 2004.12.
Tornyosnémeti –  border (1.7 km): 2018.01.16.
Miskolc-east – Tornyosnémeti (56.8 km): 2021.10.26.

Junctions, exits and rest area

 The route is full length motorway.

Maintenance
The operation and maintenance of the road by Hungarian Public Road Nonprofit Pte Ltd Co. This activity is provided by these highway engineers.
 near Emőd (M3), kilometre trench 151
 near Encs, kilometre trench 63 (under construction)

Payment
Hungarian system has 2 main type in terms of salary:

1, time-based fee vignettes (E-matrica); with a validity of either 10 days (3500 HUF), 1 month (4780 HUF) or 1 year (42980 HUF).

2, county vignettes (Megyei matrica); the highway can be used instead of the national sticker with the following county stickers:

European Route(s)

See also 

 Roads in Hungary
 Transport in Hungary
 International E-road network

References

External links 

National Toll Payment Services Plc. (in Hungarian, some information also in English)
 Hungarian Public Road Non-Profit Ltd. (Magyar Közút Nonprofit Zrt.)
 National Infrastructure Developer Ltd.
 Cohesion fund project

30